Tate Randle (born August 15, 1959 in Fredericksburg, Texas) is a former American football cornerback in the National Football League and the Arena Football League. He was drafted by the Miami Dolphins in the eight round of the 1982 NFL Draft. He played college football at Texas Tech.

Randle also played for the Houston Oilers, Baltimore / Indianapolis Colts, and Detroit Drive.

External links
Just Sports Stats

1959 births
Living people
People from Fredericksburg, Texas
Players of American football from Texas
American football cornerbacks
American football safeties
Texas Tech Red Raiders football players
Miami Dolphins players
Houston Oilers players
Baltimore Colts players
Indianapolis Colts players
Detroit Drive players
National Football League replacement players